Urbe (Genoese: , locally  or ) is a comune (municipality) in the Province of Savona in the Italian region Liguria, located about  northwest of Genoa and about  northeast of Savona.

Geography 
The municipality of Urbe contains the frazioni (subdivisions, mainly villages and hamlets) Acquabianca, Martina, San Pietro, Vara Inferiore, and Vara Superiore.

Urbe borders the following municipalities: Genoa, Ponzone, Sassello, and Tiglieto.

Demographic evolution

See also 
 Lago dell'Antenna

References

External links
 www.comune.urbe.sv.it/

Cities and towns in Liguria